Kouklia is a village in the Paphos District, about  east from the city of Paphos on the Mediterranean island of Cyprus. The village is built in the area of "Palaepaphos" (Old Paphos), mythical birthplace of Aphrodite, Greek goddess of love and beauty, which became the centre for her worship in the ancient world. Because of its ancient religious significance and architecture, Kouklia was inscribed on the UNESCO World Heritage List along with Kato Paphos in 1980. 

Recent archaeology has been continuing on the site since 2006, and remains of the ancient city and the sanctuary can be seen today.

History

From around 1200 BC, Palaepaphos was a major religious centre famous all over Cyprus, but also throughout the Mediterranean. Nevertheless, it also became a city and seat of power about which still little is known today.

Paphos was also a kingdom and the city was capital of the region.

When the last King of Palaepaphos, Nicocles, moved his capital at the end of the 4th century B.C. to the newly-founded Nea Paphos, some 16 km to the west, the old town retained some of its importance thanks to the continuation of the cult at the temple of Aphrodite. During the Roman period it became the centre of the newly established 'Koinon Kyprion', (the 'Confederation of the Cypriots'), which dealt with religious affairs, the cult of the Roman emperor and controlled the island's bronze coinage.

Sanctuary of Aphrodite

The Cypriots worshipped a goddess of fertility from as early as the Chalcolithic period (3900–2500 BC). They depicted her as a woman with the obvious characteristics of maternity and modelled figurines of her in stone or clay, of which the larger ones became objects of adoration and their smaller counterparts were worn on the body. Others were placed in graves to protect the dead. The myth that Venus (known as Aphrodite in Greek) was born on the coast of Cyprus may be connected to the adoration of this fertility goddess.

From the 12th century BC onwards, adoration of this goddess becomes particularly resplendent. It appears that before the arrival of Achaeans, Palaepaphos was already a rich city with an ornate holy altar dedicated to the goddess. Tradition holds that King Kinyras of Paphos was both very rich and a priest of Venus. Another legend relates that Agapinoras, king of Tegea and Arcadia, came to Paphos after the Trojan War and founded both the city and the holy altar of Venus. The Greeks, seemingly impressed by the greatness of the goddess of Paphos, built a large altar dedicated to her, parts of which still survive.

A covered temple was never built for the goddess at Palaepaphos but instead, the holy altar stood in the open air, encircled by walls and fitted with brightly coloured doors, according to Homer. She was not worshipped as a statue, but rather in the form of conical stone. The ancients report it as something strange, "a white pyramid of which the material is not known". This symbolic stone existed at Paphos from ancient times and, as the adoration of standing stones is a feature of eastern religions, the nearby Petra tou Romiou (Aphrodite's rock) may be responsible for the creation of the myth that she was born here.

This conical stone was found near the holy altar and is now on display at the Kouklia Museum. However, the stone is black whereas the ancients described it as white, although it may have become tarnished over the centuries. The stone remained in the holy altar site until the arrival of the Romans who placed it in the middle of a tripartite open building. The altar was already well known by the time of Homer as a location for burning incense. It was claimed that so marvellous was the altar that when it rained the stone did not become wet.

There were also votive pillars bearing symbols of the horns of a bull, and columns in the form of a tree of life. Various buildings serving the needs of the holy altar, and accommodation for the priest of the goddess and his entourage also existed on the site. A holy garden is also likely to have existed from which the nearby village of Yeroskipou takes its name. This was probably filled with trees and bushes dedicated to Venus, and with birds such as pigeons, which were beloved by the goddess. Representations on ancient vessels depict people amongst bushes, flowers and birds. Worship of the goddess was led by a priest who directed the ceremonies. Some sources claim that the first priest was Cinyras. His descendants continued as priests and were buried in the precincts of the holy altar. It is also known that later kings of Paphos were simultaneously priests. Tacitus however, relates in his Histories that the site was founded by King Aerias.

In a practice originating with eastern religions to honour Astarte, "holy marriages" may have taken place whereby a priest married a female priest to ensure the continued fertility of the earth and people.  An idea of what the goddess looked like can be gathered from recovered archeological relics which show present a richly embellished woman.  The adoration of Venus was particularly intense in the ancient period with religious ceremonies depicted on artifacts such as vases or bronze vessels. Offerings to Venus are described by ancient writers as tobacco or balm from Myra in present-day Turkey. The faithful also brought pies made with flour and oil and libations produced from honey. Tree branches were favoured by the goddess so devotees brought myrtle flowers, windflowers  and roses, because they derived from the blood of Adonis and the teardrops of Venus.

Conflicting information exists as to whether animal sacrifices took place at the site with some sources claiming that the altar of the goddess was not wetted with blood and that pigs were never sacrificed because Venus hated the animals following the killing of Adonis by a wild boar. Others insist that pigs were sacrificed.

Followers sometimes dedicated objects that depicted worshippers or the goddess herself, either in the form of a richly dressed woman or a naked Astarte. Others dedicated columns decorated with signs, statues, precious gifts and gold. Records show that the holy altar of Venus was richly endowed and that the Romans took many of its treasures to Rome.

The Ptolemaioi and the Romans attempted to import adoration of emperors and other gods in order to glamourise the holy altar. Currency of the time shows the holy altar with the conical stone still in place.

Adoration of the goddess lost its attraction with the rise of Christianity. From the 2nd century onwards the altars of the goddess were gradually abandoned. Major earthquakes in the 4th century destroyed the holy altar and its "idolatrous" building materials were then used to construct great royal edificea.

Byzantine and later eras
Under the Byzantine Empire (c. 306–1453) the village was most probably the property of the Byzantine officer known as the Kouvikoularios. In Greek, the word kouvouklion means sepulchral chamber but can also mean the dormitory of the Byzantine emperors. Bodyguards of the Byzantine Emperors who guarded the imperial dormitory were termed kouvikoularioi, and were often granted land as a reward for their services. One such kouvikoularios is likely to have become the master or owner of the village thus it was named Kou(vou)klia. Alternatively, if Kouklia was not the property of a kouvikoularios then it was probably an area dotted with country houses for Byzantine officials.

The village retained the name "Kouvouklia" until the advent of Frankish domination in the 12th century and was abbreviated to "Kouklia". De Masse Latri reports that during the Frank domination era, the village was a large royal estate where sugar cane was cultivated. 

During the Ottoman period, Kouklia was confiscated by the new conquerors and became a manor.

In 1881, Kouklia's population was 404 and rose to 520 in 1921. By 1946, that number had increased to 791 (437 Greek Cypriots and 354 Turkish Cypriots) and by 1973 to 1,110 (613 Greek Cypriots, 494 Turkish Cypriots). Following the Turkish invasion in 1974, Turkish Cypriot inhabitants of the village, under the influence of their political leaders, left the village and moved to the occupied regions. In 1976, the population of Kouklia was 732, which subsequently decreased to 681 in 1982 and 669 in 2001.

Archaeology

The entire area is an important archaeological site which includes the sanctuary of Aphrodite, a surrounding city and the remains of the fortifications. Various artifacts are on display in the archaeological museum housed in a medieval villa on the site.

The nearby Roman villa with the outstanding mosaic of Leda and the Swan is the only one excavated so far but shows the likely richness of the city in later times (early 3rd century AD).

St. Andrew's University with Liverpool City Museum excavated the site of Kouklia from 1950 to 1955. 
The so-called Siege Mound was discovered outside the walls at Marchellos and containing heavy stone balls, large numbers of weapons such as spearheads and arrows, and many architectural fragments and slabs in the Cypriot syllabic alphabet. This was thought to be a mound reported by Herodotus as built by the Persians during a siege of the city in the Ionian Revolt in 498/497 BC and used as a ramp to launch projectiles inside the city. The sculptural fragments dated from the end of the Archaic period (7th–6th century BC). The most important find was the statue of the Priest-King. Also two beautiful female heads with Egyptian hairstyles were found as well as 12 statues of young men (kouroi).

However recent research by Cyprus University since 2006 has used topographical evidence and geophysical studies to offer an alternative explanation; there are so many architectural fragments that the remains must be a deposit of an ancient acropolis with monumental buildings including a palace and sanctuary that were destroyed in the early 5th c. BC.

The Hadjiaptoullas plateau at 1 km east of the sanctuary of Aphrodite has been identified as the site of the royal palace and in 2016 a large storage and industrial complex of the Cypro-Classical period was also discovered by the University of Cyprus.

The Laona hill just north of the Hadjiabdoulla complex has been identified as a monumental tumulus measuring 100 x 60 m and over 10m high, and is extremely rare in ancient Cyprus. It is dated to the 3rd c. BC from the era of the Ptolemies. In 2016 excavations discovered an ancient rampart below the burial mound dating to the 6th century BC towards the end of the Cypro-Archaic period.

Geography
Grapes (wine-making and table varieties), bananas, various citrus fruits, avocados, apricots, kiwis, olives, locust beans, legumes, peanuts, and a large variety of vegetables are cultivated on the village's fertile land. The Randi Forest in the south-east as well as part of the Oriti Forest in the north-east fall within Kouklia's administrative boundaries. Animal husbandry is well developed in the community. Palm trees are planted in the main-street at the entrance to the village.

Tourism
The natural environment of the region, the Petra tou Romiou site, the archaeological discoveries of the area, the proximity to Aphrodite Hills Resort and the elevated views of the sea all make Kouklia a tourist destination.

Village
There is a regional elementary school in the village, attended by pupils from both Kouklia and the neighboring village of Nikokleia. 
There are also a police station, a health centre, and a state-owned nursery (greenhouse). 
In the village plaza, there are several coffee-houses  and taverns. The church of the Apostle and Evangelist Luke stands in the central plaza. 
Inhabitants of the village are known for their piety and respect for the sacred and holy chapels or ruins of chapels. 
Christos Miltiadous is the current Mayor of Kouklia. 
Most villagers work in agriculture, some in tourism related activities, while others are employed at the Aphrodite Hills Resort complex.

Twinnings
  Lemnos, Greece

References
 Kouklia Community- General Info
 Kouklia Community- Palaipafos

External links
 Kouklia Community
 Photos of Kouklia village

 
Communities in Paphos District
Cities in ancient Cyprus